Abdolmohammad Papi (born 23 August 1987) is an Iranian Greco-Roman wrestler who won the bronze medal in the 60 kg weight division at the 2011 Asian Wrestling Championships and bettered his performance in the 2013 Asian Wrestling Championships by winning a silver medal. In the final he lost to Elmurat Tasmuradov of Uzbekistan 5-1, 0-2, 1-3.

He began competing for Germany in 2022.

References

External links 
 

Living people
1987 births
Iranian male sport wrestlers
Asian Wrestling Championships medalists
20th-century Iranian people
21st-century Iranian people